Acmella uliginosa, the marsh para cress, is a species of flowering herb in the family Asteraceae. The plant is native to South America (Brazil, Bolivia, Venezuela, etc.) and is naturalized in parts of Asia (China, Philippines, India, etc.) and Africa.

References 

uliginosa
Flora of South America
Plants described in 1788